Robert Zürcher is a retired Swiss slalom canoeist who competed from the late 1950s to the mid-1960s. He won three medals in the C-2 team event at the ICF Canoe Slalom World Championships with a silver (1957) and two bronzes (1959, 1961).

References

Living people
Year of birth missing (living people)
Swiss male canoeists
Medalists at the ICF Canoe Slalom World Championships